Achkar Marof (1930-1971) was a Guinean diplomat.

Marof was born in Coyah (Republic of Guinea) in 1930 and studied at the Ecole Breguet in Paris. He became deputy director of the Ballets Africains in 1954 and was appointed as its director in 1957. He was the Guinea Permanent Representative to the United Nations, from 1964 to 1968.
Marof was recalled to Conakry, Guinea in 1968, arrested and jailed at Camp Boiro.
He briefly regained his freedom in the 1970 coup attempt. His family learned in 1985 that he had been shot on 26 January 1971.

References

External links
 Camp Boiro Memorial
 Allah Tantou- God's Will Documentary movie directed and starred by David, Achkar's son
 The African Activist Archive Project website includes the pamphlet /  Racism in South Africa: A Call for International Action (New York, American Committee on Africa, 1965) that consists of 11 addresses made in 1964 and 1965 by Achkar Marof. The website includes an address by Marof to the National Conference on the South Africa Crisis and American Action / African Continental Dynamics and International Pressures; and a 1967 leaflet /  Johannesburg South Africa advertising a meeting in memory of the South Africans killed at Sharpeville on March 21, 1960, and commemorating the United Nations' International Day for the Elimination of Racial Discrimination at which Marof was one of the speakers.

Guinean politicians
Guinean diplomats
Permanent Representatives of Guinea to the United Nations
1930 births
1971 deaths
People from Coyah
Executed Guinean people
People executed by Guinea by firearm